is a junction passenger railway station  located in Kita-ku Kobe, Hyōgo Prefecture, Japan. It is operated by the private transportation company, Kobe Electric Railway (Shintetsu).

Lines

Station layout
The station consists of two ground-level island platforms connected to the station building by a level crossing.

Platforms

History
It was renamed  on 20 March 1951, and renamed again to its present name on 1 September 1954.

Passenger statistics
In fiscal 2019, the station was used by an average of 889 passengers daily

Surrounding area
Arima Highway

See also
List of railway stations in Japan

References

External links 

 Official home page 

Railway stations in Kobe
Railway stations in Japan opened in 1928